Carpenter's Rock House is a large rock shelter in Wayne County, Kentucky, United States.  It is named for Benjamin Carpenter, an American Revolutionary War veteran who settled ca. 1785 on Carpenter Fork of Otter Creek in the central part of the county, which borders Tennessee to the south.  Photos of Carpenter's Rock House uploaded on 7 July 2003 by "worleysweb", are posted at http://outdoors.webshots.com/album/80214907uCAuqX, particularly http://outdoors.webshots.com/photo/1080069879047304351lSViqA.

References

Landforms of Wayne County, Kentucky
Rock shelters in the United States
Landforms of Kentucky